was a Japanese political figure. He was born in Ōtawara, Tochigi and graduated from the Tokyo College of Commerce (now Hitotsubashi University) in 1942.  He worked as a reporter for the Yomiuri Shimbun, a certified tax accountant, and a member of Tochigi prefectural assembly before serving as a member of House of Representatives of Japan.

He was a member of Seiran-kai, a conservative faction within the LDP, from 1973 to 1976. He later served as Health Minister from 1976 to 1977, Minister of Agriculture and Forestry from 1978 to 1979, and Minister of Finance from 1980 to 1982. He served as Deputy Prime Minister of Japan and Minister for Foreign Affairs from 1991 to 1993, and made unsuccessful bids for the presidency of the Liberal Democratic Party in 1991 and 1993. He gained some international notoriety for stating in 1988 that African Americans had "no qualms about not paying their bills," and for stating in 1995 that the Japanese annexation of Korea was done with Korea's consent.

Although he was ideologically opposed to communist China and favored Taiwan, he made efforts as Deputy Prime Minister to facilitate diplomacy between China and Japan in the wake of the 1989 Tiananmen Square protests and massacre, developing a relationship with the Chinese ambassador to Japan. He visited China for a meeting with foreign minister Qian Qichen in 1992, and the dialogue during this visit paved the way for Emperor Akihito to visit China later that year.

He was hospitalized for gallstones in 1992, but rumors of a more serious illness spread shortly thereafter, and he resigned for health reasons in 1993. After leading a Japanese delegation to North Korea in March 1995, he died from heart failure in September 1995. His eldest son, Yoshimi Watanabe, inherited his Diet seat and serves as the leader of Your Party. His grandson Michitaro Watanabe (the eldest son of his second son Michiaki Watanabe) is a member of the House of Councillors.

References

|-

|-

 

|-

|-

|-

|-

|-

|-

1923 births
1995 deaths
Politicians from Tochigi Prefecture
Hitotsubashi University alumni
Members of the House of Representatives (Japan)
Deputy Prime Ministers of Japan
Government ministers of Japan
Foreign ministers of Japan
Ministers of Finance of Japan